Helle Jensen  (born 23 March 1969) is a Danish former football forward who played for the Denmark women's national football team. She competed at the 1996 Summer Olympics, playing three matches.

See also
 Denmark at the 1996 Summer Olympics

References

External links
 }
 
 

1969 births
Living people
Danish women's footballers
Sportspeople from Aalborg
Footballers at the 1996 Summer Olympics
Olympic footballers of Denmark
Women's association football forwards
1995 FIFA Women's World Cup players
1991 FIFA Women's World Cup players
Denmark women's international footballers